The 2002 D.C. United season was the clubs' eighth year of existence, as well as their seventh season in Major League Soccer.

Under second-year head coach, Ray Hudson, United failed to qualify for the playoffs for the third consecutive season, a dry spell that would not be achieved again until the 2011 United season.

Competitions

Preseason

Major League Soccer

Standings 

Source: MLSSoccer.com
Rules for classification: 1st points; 2nd head-to-head record; 3rd goal difference; 4th number of goals scored.
(SS) = MLS Supporters' Shield; (E1) = Eastern Conference champion; (W1) = Western Conference champion
Only applicable when the season is not finished:
(Q) = Qualified for the MLS Cup Playoffs, but not yet to the particular round indicated; (E) = Eliminated from playoff-contention.

 – Since Los Angeles Galaxy won MLS Cup 2002 and the Supporters' Shield, San Jose Earthquakes qualified for the CONCACAF Champions Cup by finishing as Supporters' Shield runners-up.
 – Since Kansas City Wizards, MetroStars, and D.C. United finished outside of the top seven in the league standings, they enter the U.S. Open Cup in the third round proper rather than fourth.
 – D.C. United qualified for the CONCACAF Champions Cup by finishing runners-up in the CONCACAF Giants Cup.

Results summary

Results by round

Match reports

CONCACAF Champions' Cup

Exhibitions

References 
General 
  
 Citations

2002
Dc United
Dc United
2002 in sports in Washington, D.C.